Tiziano Andrei (born 20 January 1998) is an Italian football player. He plays as a defender.

Club career

Carrarese 
On 17 September 2017, Andrei made his professional debut, in Serie C, for Carrarese, as a substitute replacing Francesco Tavano in the 91st minute of a 3–0 home win over Olbia. On 29 October he played his first entire match for Carrarese and he scored his first professional goal in the 9th minute of a 3–2 away defeat against Lucchese.

Career statistics

Club

References

External links 

 

1998 births
People from Massa
Sportspeople from the Province of Massa-Carrara
Living people
Italian footballers
Association football defenders
Carrarese Calcio players
Serie C players
Footballers from Tuscany